Ginshachia bronacha is a moth of the  family Notodontidae. It is found on Java, Thailand, Peninsular Malaysia, Sumatra and Borneo.

Subspecies
Ginshachia bronacha bronacha (Java, Thailand)
Ginshachia bronacha aritai (Peninsular Malaysia, Sumatra, Borneo)

External links
The Moths of Borneo

Notodontidae